Alberta Provincial Highway No. 34, also known as Highway 34, was a highway in northwest Alberta, Canada, that existed in various configurations from the mid-1930s to the late 1990s. After a number of realignments affecting the east segment of the highway in the late 1950s through mid-1960s and a shortening in the early 1990s due to highway renumbering, Highway 34 spent its final years as a  highway between Highway 2 north of Grande Prairie to Valleyview before being renumbered as Highway 43 on March 1, 1998.

History 

Highway 34 was originally established as a  unnumbered graded road in the late 1930s. The road was designated Highway 34 in 1939.

By 1959, the western  stretch of Highway 34 provided access to numerous localities between Grande Prairie and Valleyview including Bezanson, Goodwin, Debolt, Crooked Creek, Clarkson Valley, Sturgeon Heights and Calais. The western  to Bezanson and the eastern  from Crooked Creek to Valleyview was paved while the remaining  between Bezanson and Crooked Creek was graveled.

Much of the stretch of Highway 34 northeast of Valleyview was realigned in 1959. The entire  stretch from Valleyview to Donnelly was graveled at that time, as was the  segment of Highway 34A. In total, Highway 34 spanned  in 1959.

Within a year, the northernmost  segment of the new Highway 34 realignment was renumbered Highway 2 in 1960 from just north of the Little Smoky River to Highway 49 near Donnelly. This was due to a realignment of Highway 2 from Triangle west to meet Highway 34 just north of the Little Smoky River.

By this time, the entire stretch from Grande Prairie to Valleyview was paved, while the stretch from Valleyview to north of the Little Smoky River remained gravel.

References 

034